Kitti,  also written as Kiti, is one of the twelve administrative divisions of the Micronesian state of Pohnpei. It is located in the southwest of the island of Pohnpei, to the south of Mount Nanlaud.

Education
Pohnpei State Department of Education operates public schools:
 Nanpei Memorial High School a.k.a. Kitti High School
 Enipein School
 Nanpei Memorial Elementary School
 Pehleng Elementary School 
 Rohi Elementary School
 Salapwuk Elementary School
 Seinwar Elementary School
 Wone Elementary School

See also
 Madolenihmw
 Sokehs
 U, Pohnpei
 Nett
 Kapingamarangi
 Pingelap
 Sapwuahfik
 Nukuoro
 Mokil
 Kolonia
 Oroluk
 Palikir

Climate
Kitti has a tropical rainforest climate (Af) with very heavy rainfall year-round.

References

 Bendure, G., & Friary, N. (1988) Micronesia: A travel survival kit. South Yarra, Australia: Lonely Planet.

Municipalities of Pohnpei